Keema matar (English: "peas and mince"), also rendered Qeema matar, is a dish from the Indian subcontinent associated with the Mughals. The term is derived from Chaghatai Turkic قیمه (minced meat) which is cognate with Turkish kıyma (minced or ground meat).

History
"Keema matar" was popularly eaten in the courts of Mughal India.

Name
The dish was originally called "keema matar" but is referred to as "matar qeema" nowadays. In Pakistan, due to the way the letter ق is pronounced, the dish is spelled with a "q" (qeema), but in India and Bangladesh it is written with a "k" (keema).

Variations 
A popular variation of this dish is aloo keema (potatoes and minced meat). It is commonly cooked in North Indian and Pakistani households. 

Keema is also used as a filling for samosas.

Ingredients

Ingredients of this dish are already specified in its name i.e. "Matar" (pea) and "Keema" (mince). Meats used include ground goat meat lamb or beef. All other ingredients include Indian spices and water with banaspati ghee.

See also
 Aloo matar
 List of legume dishes

References

Ground meat
Indian cuisine